The 2014 D1 Grand Prix series is the fourteenth season for the D1 Grand Prix series and the ninth for the D1 Street Legal spinoff series. The season began on March 29 at Fuji Speedway for the D1GP and April 12 for D1SL at Bihoku Highland Circuit. The series will conclude on October 19 with the D1 Champions' event at Odaiba Tokyo Street Course.

Regulation changes
Starting in the 2014 season, nitrous use was banned and cars are required to have catalytic converters. Also, exhaust pipes have to be pointed towards the ground.

Schedule

Event was cancelled due to weather

Drivers' rankings

D1GP

References

External links
  

D1 Grand Prix seasons
D1 Grand Prix